Perimeter security refers to natural barriers or built fortifications to either keep intruders out or to keep captives contained within the area the boundary surrounds.

Purpose
Since at least the Roman Empire, fortifications, walls and barriers have been an important part of protecting sovereign territories and private property.  Perimeter security is designed with the primary purpose to either keep intruders out or captives contained within the area the boundary surrounds.  Both natural and manmade barriers can serve as perimeter security.

Governments use perimeter security not only for the safety of their citizens, but to control the flow of commerce and immigration, as well as to protect vital infrastructure from vandals and terrorists. Property owners and organizations of all sizes use various man-made technology to achieve varying degrees of perimeter security.

History
One of the earliest known instances of perimeter security on a large scale is that of Hadrian's Wall in the Roman Empire. Around 122 AD the wall was built up along the northern border of the empire out of turf and later, stone. Theories regarding the wall's purpose vary, but most agree it was probably built at least in part for the defense of the empire.

Perhaps the most obvious illustration of perimeter security in ancient times, the Great Wall of China was originally built to withstand nomadic invaders from the North. The wall was successful to some degree, although it has been suggested that it served as more of a psychological barrier than a successful physical barrier.

In warfare, securing the perimeter has proven vital to military forces. From sharpened pikes in medieval times to more modern technological solutions, armed forces have always sought to prevent their enemies from breaching their front lines. In the American Civil War and both World Wars, as well as the Korean and Vietnam Wars, landmines were used extensively to create tactical barriers between enemy lines. These tactics are sometimes controversial because of the loss of civilian life.

In World War II, the German military developed concrete barriers called dragon's teeth to slow the approach of enemy tanks. This tactic was adopted by allied forces, and lines of reinforced concrete pyramids can still be seen throughout Europe today.

One example of perimeter protection still in use is razor wire fencing. While U.S. ranchers in the 19th century kept the cattle in and the rustlers out with barbed wire, World War I saw the advent of specialized barbed wire to secure military operations. The 1965 escalation of the Vietnam War was accelerated by the successful penetration of ten foot high concertina wire (razor wire) fencing around Camp Holloway. Variations of this type of perimeter protection were used prolifically throughout the 20th century. Booby traps, electric fencing, watch towers and night flares were also vigorously employed to keep enemy forces out.

Natural barriers
The mountains, rivers, oceans, deserts, canyons and glaciers of the world have long provided a natural barrier to invasion and trade among competing cultures. India's isolation from the rest of Asia via the Himalayas is a prime example. The English Channel proved invaluable in World War II as a deterrent to Nazi aggression. England's relative isolation allowed allied forces to use it as a staging area for the D-Day invasion, which turned the tide of the war. The Rocky Mountains in North America proved a formidable perimeter protection of isolated native cultures for centuries. Likewise, exploitation of Alaska's rich resources was greatly delayed while innovation lagged in breaking through the icy and oceanic perimeter.

Technology has largely subjugated most of the world's great natural barriers. However, deep in the Amazon remain tribes that are somewhat protected from global society due to the natural barrier of naturally harsh conditions and the vast tributary system of the Amazon River.

A similar argument can be made regarding the world's deserts. Even with advanced technology, the lack of water and harsh temperatures make traversing and living in the world's deserts a journey for a relative few. The Sahara Desert is a prime example.

Fences
Invented in the mid-1800s, the chain link fence did not achieve major adoption until industrialized manufacturing began in the United States in 1898. Still in heavy use today, this relatively cost effective perimeter is popular due to its transparency, strength, storage, and ease of installation. From airports to school playgrounds, chain link fencing demand remains strong as a long-term perimeter solution.  However, fences alone can be easily circumvented, which has led to well known incidences of airport perimeter security breaches, a man scaling the fence at the White House, etc.

Most perimeter protection solutions in the past have been large-scale, stationary solutions. This causes a great challenge for today's mobile industry and military. With smaller, rapid deployment forces the norm for most of today's military engagements, large walls, high fences, and other permanent solutions aren’t always effective. Deployments in Iraq and Afghanistan provide good examples.

Electronic technology
Beginning with the advent of electronic sensors, the concept of perimeter security evolved rapidly to include more modern, technological solutions. This allows both private entities and governments to protect wider areas with less manpower involved.  In World War II radar was first introduced to detect airplanes and ships and later ground targets.

Later, ground surveillance radar was coupled with steerable cameras that were automatically cued onto targets for quick evaluation of the threat.  These systems were large and very expensive. In the military, small force deployment has created complex perimeter protection problems. It has also created opportunities for innovation. Secure wireless communications, lightweight weaponry, faster transport and portable perimeter protection have all become vital to the success of such missions. Compact surveillance radar (CSR) deployable in minutes provides temporary or portable perimeter security.

While military applications have pressed the innovation for more mobile, affordable perimeter protection, today's growing threats to homeland security have launched another wave of pioneering products to protect airports, bridges, harbors, dams and electrical substations. These include solutions such as thermal cameras, compact radar, microwave and radiowave fences, and biometric scanning, most of which can be linked to smartphone or tablet technology.

See also

Access control
Perimeter fence
Crime scene

References

 
Imprisonment and detention
Fortifications by type